Manchester Southern is a parliamentary constituency represented in the House of Representatives of the Jamaican Parliament. It elects one Member of Parliament MP by the first past the post system of election. The constituency was one of the original 32 parliamentary seats.

Members of Parliament

1944 to 1959

1967 to present

Constituency Boundary 

https://ecj.com.jm/boundaries/parishes/constituencies/manchester/manchester-southern/

References

Parliamentary constituencies of Jamaica